FC Besa Pejë, commonly known as Besa Pejë, is a football club based in Peja, Kosovo. Their home ground is Shahin Haxhiislami and they compete in the Second Football League of Kosovo.

History

Early history (1923–1945)
The current club is considered to be the successor of a number of different football and sports clubs that had been active in the city of Peja since 1923, with the first being Behari i Ri who were the original club that today's KF Besa Pejë is based on. In 1924 another club named Gajret Pejë was formed, but ended disbanded soon after. Other clubs that were also formed in Peć at the time were Zeleni Venac in 1925, Tarabosh in 1927, Dukagjini Pejë in 1928, Radnički Peć in 1930, Budućnost Peć in 1935 and Ardhmëria Pejë who were active between 1941 and 1945. Between 1923 and World War II, the different clubs representing the city of Peć competed only in friendly tournaments as none of the clubs were members of the Belgrade Football Subassociation. A club representing the city competed in the 1942 Albanian Superliga, but the war period championships that were held in Albania are not recognised by the Albanian Football Association.

Development of football (1945–1991)
Following the end of World War II, football in Peć and the rest of the Kosovo region became more prominent and this was in no part due to the rise in tournaments and championships that were held regularly. The most dominant club of the post war era was Yugoslav backed FK Budućnost Peć, but other clubs were also active including Përparimi Pejë, who only functioned between 1949 and 1951. Other clubs active after World War II included Kombinati i Drurit, Klubi Kristal, who were active between 1973 and 1990. Another club that was formed in the 1970s was Klubi Kombinatit Bujqësor Industrial, a club heavily involved in the agricultural business at the time. In 1974 the first club to be called Besa was formed, which is where the current name of the club comes from, which is an Albanian cultural precept meaning "faith" and "to keep a promise". Other clubs were formed to represent the different professions in the city at the time, including Klubi Fabrikës së Autopjesëve of the automobile parts factory, Klubi Kombinatit të Lëkur-Këpucëve of the leather and footwear factory and Kosovatransi Klubi Ndërrmarjes Transportuese Të Udhëtarëve of the shipyard passenger transport profession.

End of Yugoslavia (1991–1998)
There was widespread ethnic tension in Yugoslavia in the 1990s.  The three main clubs that were left in Peć at the time, Besa, Budućnost and Kristal, held a joint assembly early in 1991 and decided to merge the clubs in order to create what is now known as KF Besa Pejë that was to compete in the independent League of Kosovo that was organised by the Football Federation of Kosovo, which was out of the Yugoslav football league system. This parallel competitions were of poor standard and were limited to matches played in remote villages on fields rather since the stadiums were still property of the clubs which were competing in the Yugoslav leagues. Until 1996 the Kosovo Superleague was held in four different groups, whose winners would then face each other in a playoff to determine the champions, but in 1996 the original league format was restored. The 1997–98 Kosovo Superleague was interrupted due to the start of the Kosovo War while KF Besa was top of the league.

Post war rebuilding (1999–2003)
The Kosovo War devastated the country, including Peć, and sports activities were put on hold in 1999. Football, much like most things in Kosovo, had to restart once again and the development of KF Besa Pejë was slow as the club began to rebuild from 1999. The club relied on donors from the city, and the main donor of the post war period was Birra Peja and the brewery, who became the club's main financier in July 2003.

Honours
Kosovo Superleague
Winners (3): 2004–05, 2005–06, 2006–07

Kosovar Cup
Winners (3): 2005–06, 2010–11, 2016–17

Kosovar Supercup
Winners (1): 2004–05

Players

Current squad

Out on loan

Personnel

Historical list of coaches

 Valdet Shoshi (2004 - 2005)
 Genc Hoxha (2005 - 2007)
 Miftar Rama (2013)
 Arbnor Morina (27 Aug 2014 - 7 Apr 2016)
 Ilir Nallbani (Apr 2016  -May 2016) (caretaker)
 Gani Sejdiu (23 May 2016  -Mar 2017)
 Astrit Imami (13 Mar 2017  - Jul 2017) 
 Valdet Shoshi (27 Jul 2017  - May 2018)
 Ismet Munishi (25 May 2018 - 14 Sep 2018)
 Miftar Rama (2019 -)

Notes

References

External links
 KF Besa official website

FC Besa Pejë
Sport in Peja
FC Besa Pejë